The 2014 Indiana State Sycamores football team represented Indiana State University in the 2014 NCAA Division I FCS football season. They were led by second-year head coach Mike Sanford and played their home games at Memorial Stadium. They were a member of the Missouri Valley Football Conference. They finished the season 8–6, 4–4 in MVFC play to finish in a tie for fifth place. They made their third post-season appearance in the FCS Playoffs; they defeated Eastern Kentucky  in the first round before losing in the second round to Chattanooga.

Connor Underwood, a junior Linebacker was named 2d team "All-American" by the Associated Press and 1st team by The Sporting News. Quarterback Mike Perish, set career marks for touchdowns, passing yards, attempts and pass completions.  Head Coach Mike Sandford was named the Regional (#4) Coach of the Year by the AFCA.

Schedule

Source: Schedule

Ranking movements

References

Indiana State
Indiana State Sycamores football seasons
Indiana State
Indiana State Sycamores football